Będogoszcz  is a settlement in the administrative district of Gmina Stare Czarnowo, within Gryfino County, West Pomeranian Voivodeship, in north-western Poland.

See also
History of Pomerania

References

Villages in Gryfino County